Mick O'Hare (born 1964 in Mirfield, England) is a British editor and writer.

Life 
O'Hare is an editor at New Scientist, the leading British science weekly, where, among other things, he edits "The Last Word" column, a collection of quirky questions and answers. O'Hare edited the bestselling books "Does Anything Eat Wasps?", which had sales of over half a million (539,532) and "Why Don’t Penguins’ Feet Freeze?", which topped three-quarters of a million (849,976) copies. (The series' most recent title, "How Long is Now?" which, for unknown reasons, was not edited by O'Hare, was considerably less successful, selling only 22,797 copies.) O'Hare's books have been translated into more than 30 languages.

Prior to joining New Scientist in 1992, he was the production editor for Autosport. He continues to occasionally works as a rugby league writer and also to edit sports books. He has a geology degree.

Bibliography
Does Anything Eat Wasps? and 101 Other Questions
 How to Fossilise Your Hamster: And Other Amazing Experiments for the Armchair Scientist
Why Don't Penguins' Feet Freeze?: And 114 Other Questions
The Last Word: Vol 1, Mick O'Hare, illustrated by Spike Gerrell
 The Last Word: More Questions and Answers on Everyday Science Vol 2, Mick O'Hare, illustrated by Spike Gerrell
 Do Polar Bears Get Lonely? And 101 Other Intriguing Science Questions
How to Make a Tornado: The strange and wonderful things that happen when scientists break free, 2009, Profile Books, 
 Why Can't Elephants Jump? And 113 More Science Questions Answered
 Why Are Orangutans Orange: Science Questions in Pictures – With Fascinating Answers
 Will We Ever Speak Dolphin?": And 130 Other Science Questions Answered

References

British science writers
Living people
1964 births